John Wayne Sace (born May 9, 1989) is a Filipino character actor and dancer. He first rose to prominence from being a former child actor to a teen idol.

Life and career
Sace was a member of ABS-CBN network's circle of homegrown talents called Star Magic. He started off as a child actor and later became a member of the defunct ASAP boy dance group AnimE along with Rayver Cruz, Rodjun Cruz, Mhyco Aquino, Sergio Garcia, Emman Abeleda and Mico Aytona. After an average success of being a teen idol, Sace's career went stiff due to a number of personal issues.

Sace was raised by his grandparents while his immediate family is residing in the United States. Sace was once separated from his non-showbiz wife but later reunited, with whom he has three children.

On October 12, 2016, Sace was injured, while his friend died after a shooting incident which took place in Pasig. Sace and Eric Sabino, his deceased companion, were part of the Pasig city police's drug watch list for their involvement in illegal drugs use.

He returned to mainstream acting via FPJ's Ang Probinsyano in 2021.

Filmography

Television

Film

Awards and nominations

References

External links
 

1989 births
Living people
Filipino male child actors
Filipino male television actors
Participants in Philippine reality television series
Star Magic